Telomere-associated protein RIF1 is a protein that in humans is encoded by the RIF1 gene.

RIF1 and RIF2 cap the chromosome ends (telomeres) in yeast. In higher eukaryotes, Rif1 is involved in DNA damage response, organisation of chromatin architecture and the regulation of replication timing. RIF1 has been shown to bind to RNA in the nucleus.

References

Further reading 

 
 
 
 
 
 

Telomere-binding proteins